Teenaa Kaur Pasricha is an Indian Film Director, writer and documentary producer based in Mumbai. She has won  National Film Award, fellowship in screenplay writing from Asia Society, NY and fellowship in films for Social Change from USA Dept. Of Cultural Affairs. She has been writing, directing and producing documentary films on social justice and conservation of environment. Her films have been broadcast on National Geographic, Fox History, DD funded by PSBT, BUSAN Intl. film festival, Films Division.

Teenaa made a breakthrough with her documentary "1984, When the Sun didn’t Rise" which is based on the lives of the women who survived the massacre of 1984.,

She received the National Film Award for Best investigative film- Best Producer, Best Director.

She is passionate about travel, environment and various social causes.

Career
Teenaa Kaur got prestigious "AND" fund from Busan International Film Festival's prestigious funding 2015 for the film 1984, When the Sun didn't Rise. She is a Production and Industrial Engineering Graduate from M.B.M. Engineering College, Jodhpur.

Her other films are on environment and wildlife conservation. The deer, tree and me is a creative documentary, was nominated for Best Documentary in Mumbai International Film Festival, (MIFF) 2016. It was premiered in SiGNS Film Festival, Kochi 2015 and also screened in Kolkata International Association of Women in Radio and Television (IAWRT) film festival, 2016.

In Symphony with Earth was broadcast on National Geographic and Fox History. The Woods are Calling has been made for Public Service Broadcasting Trust (PSBT). It has been broadcast on Doordarshan, Dhaka International Film Festival 2018, Quotes from the Earth film festival 2018. The film has been screened at Sunchild International Environmental Festival, Yerevan, Kolkata People’s Film Festival (KPFF).

Her feature film "MAUJJ" has been selected and mentored at NFDC Script Lab. She received the Jai Chandiram Fellowship award for her upcoming documentary film "What if I tell you", awarded by IAWRT film festival. 

Her films have been screened in various universities across the globe.

Filmography
 1984, When the Sun Didn't Rise (2017)
 The Woods are Calling (2017)
 The deer, tree and me (2015)
 In Symphony with Earth (2012)
 Hola! The Mighty Colors (2011)

Awards and nominations
2018 - Won  for the Best Investigative Film at the 65th National Film Awards for 1984, When the Sun Didn't Rise
2018 - Nominated for the National Competition at the Mumbai International Film Festival for 1984, When the Sun Didn't Rise
2016 - Nominated for the Best Documentary at the Mumbai International Film Festival for The deer, tree and me

References

Living people
Indian women film directors
Indian documentary filmmakers
Women documentary filmmakers
Year of birth missing (living people)